BRAC is an international development organisation based in Bangladesh. In order to receive foreign donations, BRAC was subsequently registered under the NGO Affairs Bureau of the Government of Bangladesh. BRAC is the largest non-governmental development organisation in the world, in terms of number of employees as of September 2016. Established by Sir Fazle Hasan Abed in 1972 after the independence of Bangladesh, BRAC is present in all 64 districts of Bangladesh as well as 11 other countries in Asia, Africa, and the Americas.

BRAC states that it employs over 90,000 people, roughly 70 percent of whom are women, and that it reaches more than 126 million people with its services. The organisation is partly self-funded through a number of social enterprises that include a dairy and food project, a chain of retail handicraft stores called Aarong, seed and Agro, and chicken. BRAC has operations in 12 countries of the world.

History

Known formerly as the Bangladesh Rehabilitation Assistance Committee, then as the Bangladesh Rural Advancement Committee, and later as Building Resources Across Communities, BRAC was initiated in 1972 by Sir Fazlé Hasan Abed  at Shallah Upazillah in the district of Sunamganj as ll-scale relief and rehabilitation project to help returning war refugees after the Bangladesh Liberation War of 1971. 14 thousand homes had to be rebuilt as part of the relief effort, as well as several hundred fishing boats; BRAC claims to have done this within nine months, as well as opening medical centres and providing other essential services.

Until the mid-1970s, BRAC concentrated on community development through village development programmes that included agriculture, fisheries, cooperatives, rural crafts, adult literacy, health and family planning, vocational training for women and construction of community centres. A Research and Evaluation Division (RED) was set up to evaluate its activities and decide direction, and in 1977, BRAC began taking a more targeted approach by creating Village Organisations (VO) to assist the landless, small farmers, artisans, and vulnerable women. That same year BRAC set up a commercial printing press to help finance its activities. The handicraft retail chain called Aarong was established the following year.

In the late 1970s, diarrhoea was a leading cause of child mortality in Bangladesh. In February 1979, BRAC began a field trial, in two villages of what was then Sulla thana, of a campaign to combat diarrhoea. The following year they scaled up the operation and named it the Oral Therapy Extension Programme (OTEP). It taught rural mothers in their homes how to prepare an oral rehydration solution (ORS) from readily available ingredients and how to use it to treat diarrhoea. The training was reinforced with posters and radio and TV spots.

The ten-year programme taught 12 million households spread over 75,000 villages in every part of Bangladesh except the Chittagong Hill Tracts (which were unsafe to work in because of civil unrest). Fifteen years after they were taught, the vast majority of mothers could still prepare a safe and effective ORS. The treatment was little known in Bangladesh when OTEP began, but 15 years later it was used in rural households for severe diarrhoea more than 80% of the time, one of the highest rates in the world.

Non Formal Primary Education was started by BRAC in 1985.

In 1986, BRAC started its Rural Development Programme that incorporated four major activities – institution building including functional education and training, credit operation, income and employment generation and support service programmes.

In 1991, the Women's Health Development programme commenced. The following year BRAC established a Centre for Development Management (CDM) in Rajendrapur.

Its Social Development, Human Rights and Legal Services programme was launched in 1996.

In 1998, BRAC's Dairy and Food project was commissioned. BRAC launched an Information Technology Institute the following year.

In 2001, BRAC established a university called BRAC University.

Programmes

Economic development
Microfinance, introduced in 1974, is BRAC's oldest programme. It spans all districts of Bangladesh. It provides collateral-free loans to mostly poor, landless, rural women, enabling them to generate income and improve their standards of living. BRAC's microcredit program has funded over $1.9 billion in loans in its first 40 years. 95% of BRACs microloan customers are women. According to BRAC, the repayment rate is over 98%. BRAC started community empowerment programme back in 1988 all over the country.

BRAC founded its retail outlet, Aarong (Bengali for "village fair") in 1978 to market and distribute products made by indigenous peoples. Aarong services about 65,000 artisans, and sells gold and silver jewellery, hand loom, leather crafts, etc.

The Challenging the Frontiers of Poverty Reduction: Targeting the Ultra Poor (CFPR-TUP) project was initiated in 2002. The ultra poor are a group of people who eat below 80% of their energy requirements despite spending at least 80% of income on food. In Bangladesh, they constitute the poorest 17.5 percent of the population. These people suffer from chronic hunger and malnutrition, have inadequate shelter, are more prone to disease, deprived of education and more vulnerable to recurring natural disasters. The CFPR-TUP programme is aimed at households which are too poor to access the benefits from development interventions such as microfinance and assists them to access mainstream development services. The program costs around US$35 million a year.

Education
BRAC is one of the largest NGOs involved in primary education in Bangladesh. As of the end of 2012, it had more than 22,700 non-formal primary schools with a combined enrolment of 670,000 children. Its schools constitute three-quarters of all NGO non-formal primary schools in the country.

BRAC's education programme provides non-formal primary education to those left out of the formal education system, especially poor, rural, or disadvantaged children, and drop-outs.  Its schools are typically one room with one teacher and no more than 33 students.  Core subjects include mathematics, social studies and English. The schools also offer extracurricular activities.  They incentivise schooling by providing food, allowing flexible learning hours, and conferring scholarships contingent on academic performance.

Bangladesh has reduced the gap between male and female attendance in schools.  The improvement in female enrollment, which has largely been at the primary level, is in part attributable to BRAC.  Roughly 60% of the students in their schools are girls.

BRAC also runs a university called BRAC University.

Public health
BRAC started providing public healthcare in 1972 with an initial focus on curative care through paramedics and a self-financing health insurance scheme. The programme went on to offer integrated health care services.

BRAC's 2007 impact assessment of its North West Microfinance Expansion Project testified to increased awareness of legal issues, including those of marriage and divorce, among women participants in BRAC programs. Furthermore, women participants' self-confidence was boosted and incidence of domestic violence were found to have declined. One of the most prominent forms of violence against women, acid throwing, has been decreasing by 15-20% annually since the enactment in 2002 of legislation specifically targeting acid violence.

Disaster relief
BRAC conducted one of the largest NGO responses to Cyclone Sidr which hit vast areas of the south-western coast in Bangladesh in mid-November 2007. BRAC distributed emergency relief materials, including food and clothing, to over 900,000 survivors, provided medical care to over 60,000 victims and secured safe supplies of drinking water. BRAC is now focusing on long-term rehabilitation, which will include agriculture support, infrastructure reconstruction and livelihood regeneration.

Partnership with the Nike Foundation
BRAC has a collaboration with Nike's Girl Effect campaign to launch a new program to reach out to teenagers in Uganda and Tanzania.

Donors
In 2006 BRAC received donations from Directorate-General for International Cooperation (DGIS) and Government of the Netherlands / Embassy of the Kingdom of the Netherlands (EKN).

In 2011 the Bill and Melinda Gates Foundation (BMGF) joined the list of BRAC donors.

In 2012 the Department for International Development (DFID), Government of the UK and Department of Foreign Affairs and Trade (DFAT), and Australian Government (SPA) (under the strategic partnership arrangement) became BRAC donors as well.

Geographic scope
BRAC operates in 13 countries.
 Asia: Bangladesh, Afghanistan, Sri Lanka, Pakistan, Philippines, Nepal, Myanmar
 Africa: Uganda, Rwanda, Tanzania, South Sudan, Liberia, Sierra Leone
 Caribbean: Haiti
 BRAC provides technical assistance to organisations in Haiti, Sudan, and Indonesia
 BRAC has affiliate organisations in the United Kingdom and United States

Honours and awards
 Number one NGO in the world, 2019 by NGO Advisor.
 Number one NGO in the world, 2018
 Number one NGO in the world, 2017 by NGO Advisor
 Number one NGO in the world, 2016 by NGO Advisor

See also
 Al Manahil Welfare Foundation Bangladesh
 ASA (NGO)
 Grameen Bank

References

Further reading
 Banu, Dilruba, Fehmin Farashuddin, Altaf Hossain, and Shahnuj Akter. "Empowering Women in Rural Bangladesh: Impact of Bangladesh Rural Advancement Committee's Impact." (n.d.): n. pag. BRAC. Web.
 
 Rohde, J. E. "BRAC- Learning To Reach Health For All." Bulletin Of The World Health Organization 84.8 (2006): 682–83. Web.
 "World Winners From WISE." Education Journal 130 (2011): 32. Web.
 Smillie, Ian. Freedom From Want: The Remarkable Success Story of BRAC, the Global Grassroots Organization That's Winning the Fight Against Poverty, 2009.
 Lovell, Catherine. Breaking the Cycle of Poverty: The BRAC Strategy, 1992.
 Is Bigger Better?, Forbes.
 Creating Emerging Markets Project, Sir Fazle Hasan Abed

External links
 
 BRAC University
 BRAC Research and Evaluation Division Archive
 BRAC Bank
 BRACNet Limited
 e-hut
 An Army of Housewives Battles TB in Bangladesh, The New York Times
 
 The Story of BRAC, PBS
 Girl Effect, BRAC's partnership with Nike

01
Child education organizations
International climate change organizations
Nature conservation organisations based in Asia
Economic development organizations
Microfinance organizations
Organizations established in 1972
Poverty-related organizations
Rural community development
Microfinance banks
Organisations based in Dhaka